The Iron Brigade, also known as  The Black Hats, Black Hat Brigade, Iron Brigade of the West, and originally King's Wisconsin Brigade was an infantry brigade in the Union Army of the Potomac during the American Civil War. Although it fought entirely in the Eastern Theater, it was composed of regiments from three Western states that are now within the region of the Midwest. Noted for its strong discipline, its unique uniform appearance and its tenacious fighting ability, the Iron Brigade suffered the highest percentage of casualties of any brigade in the war.

The nickname "Iron Brigade," with its connotation of fighting men with iron dispositions, was applied formally or informally to a number of units in the Civil War and in later conflicts. The Iron Brigade of the West was the unit that received the most lasting publicity in its use of the nickname.

Nickname

The Iron Brigade initially consisted of the 2nd, 6th, and 7th Wisconsin Volunteer Infantry Regiments, the 19th Indiana, Battery B of the 4th U.S. Light Artillery, and was later joined by the 24th Michigan. This particular composition of men, from the three Western states, led it to be sometimes referred to as the "Iron Brigade of the West". They were known throughout the war as the "Black Hats" because of the black 1858 model Hardee hats issued to Army regulars, rather than the blue kepis worn by most other Union Army units.

The all-Western brigade, composed of Wisconsin, Michigan and Indiana troops, earned their famous nickname, while under the command of Brig. Gen. John Gibbon, who led the brigade into its first battle. On August 28, 1862, during the preliminary phases of the Second Battle of Bull Run, it stood up against attacks from a superior force under Maj. Gen Thomas J. "Stonewall" Jackson at Brawner's Farm, during the waning hours of August 28th, 1862. The brigade would lose 800 casualties, the 2nd Wisconsin losing 276 out of 430 who went into the fight, and at least half of their wounded being shot twice.  The designation "Iron Brigade" is said to have originated during the brigade's action at Turners Gap, during the Battle of South Mountain, a prelude to the Battle of Antietam in September 1862. Maj. Gen. Joseph Hooker, commanding I Corps, approached Army of the Potomac commander Maj. Gen. George B. McClellan, seeking orders. As the Western men advanced up the National Road, forcing the Confederate line all the way back to the gap, McClellan asked, "What troops are those fighting in the Pike?" Hooker replied, "[Brigadier] General Gibbon's brigade of Western men." McClellan stated, "They must be made of iron." Hooker said that the brigade had performed even more superbly at Second Bull Run; to this, McClellan said that the brigade consisted of the "best troops in the world". Hooker supposedly was elated and rode off without his orders. There are a few stories related to the origin, but the men immediately adopted the name, which was quickly used in print after South Mountain.

History

The unit that eventually became known as the Iron Brigade was activated on October 1, 1861, upon the arrival in Washington, D.C., of the 7th Wisconsin. It was combined into a brigade with the 2nd and 6th Wisconsin, and the 19th Indiana, under the command of Brig. Gen. Rufus King and were originally known as King's Wisconsin Brigade. The governor of Wisconsin, Alexander Randall, had hoped to see the formation of an entirely Wisconsin brigade, but the Army unwittingly frustrated his plans by transferring the 5th Wisconsin from King's brigade and including the Hoosiers instead. This brigade was initially designated the 3rd Brigade of Maj. Gen. Irvin McDowell's division of the Army of the Potomac, and then the 3rd Brigade, I Corps.

McDowell's I Corps did not join the bulk of the Army of the Potomac in the Peninsula Campaign. In June 1862 it was redesignated the III Corps of Maj. Gen. John Pope's Army of Virginia. Now under the command of John Gibbon, a regular Army officer from North Carolina who chose to stay with the Union, King's brigade was designated the 4th Brigade, 1st Division, III Corps, and it saw its first combat in the Northern Virginia Campaign, fighting at Brawner's Farm, August 28th, 1862, where they received their deadly baptism of fire. Gibbon's brigade would lose 725 men out of 1900, the 2nd Wisconsin  losing 276 out of 430 men.  Almost immediately following the Union defeat in the Second Battle of Bull Run, the III Corps was transferred back to the Army of the Potomac and redesignated the I Corps, under the command of Joseph Hooker; Gibbon's brigade became the 4th Brigade, 1st Division, I Corps.

The brigade next went into action at The Battle Of South Mountain,  September 14th, 1862, where they would receive their coveted nickname. Then again at the Battle Of Antietam, September 17th, 1862. Where the brigade would be heavily engaged in the Cornfield. Of the 800 men of the Iron Brigade engaged at Antietam, 343 were killed or wounded, the 6th Wisconsin would lose 150 out of the 280 men they would bring into battle that day.

The 24th Michigan Volunteer Infantry Regiment joined the brigade on October 8, 1862, prior to the Battle of Fredericksburg in December. The Iron Brigade was not heavily engaged in the battle of Fredericksburg, besides for some minor actions by the 24th Michigan. On February 27, 1863, the brigade, now under the command of Brig. Gen. Solomon Meredith, was redesignated the 1st Brigade, 1st Division, I Corps. The 6th Wisconsin and the 24th Michigan would take part in the attacks at Fizthugh's crossing, April 29th, 1863, losing a combined total casualty list of 58.  

The brigade commanders, disregarding temporary assignments, were:

Brig. Gen. Rufus King: September 28, 1861 – May 7, 1862
Brig. Gen. John Gibbon: May 7, 1862 – November 4, 1862
Brig. Gen. Solomon Meredith: November 25, 1862 – July 1, 1863 (wounded at Gettysburg)

The Iron Brigade lost its all-Western status on July 16, 1863, following its crippling losses at Gettysburg, when the 167th Pennsylvania was incorporated into it, and a company of New York sharpshooters. However, the brigade that succeeded it, which included the survivors of the Iron Brigade, was commanded by:

Col. William W. Robinson (of the 7th Wisconsin): July 1, 1863 – March 25, 1864
Brig. Gen. Lysander Cutler (6th Wisconsin): March 25, 1864 – May 6, 1864
Col. William W. Robinson: May 6, 1864 – June 7, 1864
Brig. Gen. Edward S. Bragg (6th Wisconsin): June 7, 1864 – February 10, 1865
Col. John A. Kellogg (6th Wisconsin): February 28, 1865 – April 27, 1865
Col. Henry A. Morrow (24th Michigan): April 27, 1865 – June 5, 1865

The brigade would fight in the bloody Overland campaign of 1864, and would take part in the siege of Petersburg for the rest of the war.

The 19th Indiana would eventually be transferred to the 20th Indiana Infantry Regiment in October, 1864. The 2nd Wisconsin would leave the brigade once they mustered out in 1864, and the 24th Michigan would be transferred up north for guard duty. The 6th Wisconsin and 7th Wisconsin fight together till the end of the war. 

In June 1865, the units of the surviving brigade were separated and reassigned to the Army of the Tennessee.

The brigade fought in the battles of Second Bull Run, Antietam, Fredericksburg, Chancellorsville, Gettysburg, Mine Run, Overland, Richmond-Petersburg, and Appomattox.

The brigade took pride in its designation, "1st Brigade, 1st Division, I Corps", under which it played a prominent role in the first day of the Battle of Gettysburg, July 1, 1863. It repulsed the first Confederate offensive through Herbst's Woods, led by the 2nd Wisconsin, capturing much of Brig. Gen. James J. Archer's brigade, and Archer himself. The 6th Wisconsin (along with 100 men of the brigade guard) are remembered for their famous charge on an unfinished railroad cut north and west of the town, where they captured the flag of the 2nd Mississippi and took hundreds of Confederate prisoners. The rest of the Iron Brigade would be counterattacked in the early afternoon of July 1st, The Brigade would initially hold their ground against the rebel counterattack. However, the pressure would eventually be too heavy, and the Brigade would slowly fall back to Seminary Ridge. The Brigade survivors defended the north slope of Culp’s Hill on July 2,3, where the 6th Wisconsin made a night counterattack to restore Union positions previously lost to Confederate troops. Out of the 1,883 men the Brigade initially went to battle with, only 671 reported for duty.

The Iron Brigade, proportionately, suffered the most casualties of any brigade in the Civil War. For example, 61% (1,153 out of 1,885) were casualties at Gettysburg. Similarly, the 2nd Wisconsin, which suffered 77% casualties at Gettysburg, suffered the third highest total throughout the war; it was third behind the 24th Michigan (also an Iron Brigade regiment) as well as the 1st Minnesota in total casualties at Gettysburg. The Michigan regiment lost 397 out of 496 soldiers, an 80% casualty rate. The 1st Minnesota actually suffered the highest casualty percentage of any Union regiment in a single Civil War engagement during the battle of Gettysburg, losing 216 out of 262 men (82%).  

The last surviving member of the Iron Brigade, Josiah E. Cass of Eau Claire, Wisconsin, died on 2 December 1947 of a fractured hip suffered in a fall. He was 100 years old.

Uniforms

The uniform of the Iron brigade differed some what to the standard uniform of the Union army at the time. It was designed to be more of a dress uniform that resembled a suit rather than the more common infantry men's kit. It consisted of:

A Hardee black hat: A tall blocked, brimmed black hat, featuring a brass infantry bugle, a red I Corps circle patch and brass numbers/letters of the front to indicate units and companies. A brass eagle badge on the side used to hold the brim up in a slouch, and finally an ostrich feather plume.

Union Frock coat.: A long, dark blue coat that came down to the mid thighs, resembling that of an officers coat. Fitted with a single breasted row of nine brass buttons, each with the federal eagle on them. The cuffs and collars had light blue trimming and two smaller brass buttons on the cuffs. The inside of the coat was lined with cotton to make a better fit.

Light/dark blue trousers: depending on the period of the war and unit, trousers versed from light, sky blue to a dark blue the same colour as the coat. The trouser extended from the mid waist down to the ankles and had a pocket on either side.

White canvas gaiter: white canvas leggings with leather straps to prevent stones and dirt getting into the shoes whilst in the field.

All other equipment not mentioned included standard field equipment of the Union army consisting of canteens, belts, cartridge box, bayonet and scabbard, haversack and other various items of kit.

Weapons

The Springfield Model 1861 rifled musket, firing the .58 caliber projectile, was issued to the 6th Wisconsin, 19th Indiana, and 24th Michigan regiments. This single-shot, muzzle loading, percussion cap rifle weighed nine pounds with a barrel length of forty inches. It was the most widely issued infantry weapon used by Federal troops. The Second and Seventh Wisconsin used the Lorenz Rifle.

"On the Union side, continental European firearms were mostly distributed to the Western armies--as such, the Lorenz Rifle was relatively uncommon in the Army of the Potomac (although two regiments of the famous Iron Brigade carried them) but heavily used by the Army of the Cumberland and Army of Tennessee.

Other Iron Brigades

Union Army
There have been other brigades known by the same name. Another brigade in the Army of the Potomac had previously been known as the Iron Brigade, later the "Iron Brigade of the East" or "First Iron Brigade", to avoid confusion. This unit was the 1st Brigade, 1st Division, I Corps, also known as Merideth's Brigade. It consisted of the 22nd New York, 24th New York, 30th New York, 14th Regiment (New York State Militia), and 2nd U.S. Sharpshooters. Although this Iron Brigade of the East served in the same infantry division as the Iron Brigade of the West, press attention focused primarily on the latter. Most of the Eastern regiments were mustered out before the Battle of Gettysburg, where the remaining Eastern Iron Brigade Regiments and the Iron Brigade of the West arguably achieved their greatest fame.

Recent scholarship identifies two other brigades referred to by their members or others as "The Iron Brigade":
3rd Brigade, 1st Division, III Corps (17th Maine, 3rd Michigan, 5th Michigan, 1st, 37th, and 101st New York)
Reno's Brigade from the North Carolina expedition (21st and 35th Massachusetts, 51st Pennsylvania, and 51st New York)

The Horn Brigade, a unit serving in the Western Theater, was known as the "Iron Brigade of the Army of the Cumberland."

Confederate Army - Shelby's Iron Brigade
Shelby's Iron Brigade was a Confederate cavalry brigade also known as the "Missouri Iron Brigade". The Confederate Iron Brigade was part of the division, commanded by Brig. Gen. Joseph O. "Jo" Shelby, in the Army of Arkansas and fought in Maj. Gen. Sterling Price's Missouri Expedition, in 1864.

Modern U.S. Army
The 2nd Brigade of the U.S. Army's 1st Armored Division has carried the Iron Brigade moniker since 1985 and was previously called the "Black Hat" Brigade.

The 3rd Brigade Combat Team, 1st Infantry Division was known as the Iron Brigade from its formation in 1917 through World War I, World War II and Vietnam, until some time in the early 2000s when, for reasons that are still unclear, the name was changed to Duke Brigade.  The unit crest was an Iron Cross in a triangle, it appears that that was also changed.
The 3rd Brigade of the 4th Infantry Division is also known as the Iron Brigade. Its unit crest is similar to the medals issued to veterans of both the Western and the Eastern Iron Brigades of the Army of the Potomac.
The 1st Heavy Brigade Combat Team of the 2nd Infantry Division (United States) is known as the Iron Brigade as well. Located at Camp Casey, South Korea, the brigade has a critical role of military deterrence on the Korean Peninsula.

The 2nd Brigade of the 3rd Armored Division (Spearhead), formerly stationed on Coleman Kaserne in Gelnhausen, Germany.

The 157th Maneuver Enhancement Brigade, also known as the Iron Brigade, is based out of Milwaukee, Wisconsin. It was formerly known as the 57th Field Artillery Brigade, at which time its subordinate organizations included the 1st Battalion, 126th Field Artillery Regiment and the 1st Battalion, 121st Field Artillery Regiment from the Wisconsin Army National Guard, plus the 1st Battalion, 182nd Field Artillery Regiment of the Michigan Army National Guard. Not to be confused with the famous "Iron Brigade" of the Civil War, the 57th Field Artillery Brigade is also known as the "Iron Brigade," a nickname traditionally given to crack artillery units in the Civil War. It was during World War I that the 57th Field Artillery Brigade earned its nickname as it spent many hours at the front and fired more artillery rounds than any brigade in the American Army.

The 32nd Infantry Division was an infantry division of the United States Army National Guard that fought primarily during World War I and World War II. It was formed with units from the states of Wisconsin and Michigan. With roots as the Iron Brigade in the American Civil War, the division's ancestral units came to be referred to as the Iron Jaw Division. The division was briefly called up during the Berlin Crisis in 1961. In 1967, the division was deactivated and reconstituted the 32nd Infantry Brigade of the Wisconsin Army National Guard only to be reorganized in 2007 as the 32nd Infantry Brigade Combat Team. The shoulder sleeve insignia currently worn is a red line shot through with a red arrow, giving them the nickname Red Arrow Brigade, which was earned in World War I where the 32nd Division was fighting the Germans alongside the French, who noted the unit's tenacity by punching through the German lines, like an arrow and calling the unit Les Terribles, meaning The Terrors.

Sports
The name "Iron Brigade" has also been used to describe the offensive line of the University of Wisconsin Badger Football Team.  The line is known for its size, strength, and dedication to the protection of the backfield.  The Badgers play in Camp Randall Stadium, a site used to train Wisconsin volunteers during the Civil War.

Notes

References
 Beaudot, William J. K., and Herdegen, Lance J., In the Bloody Railroad Cut at Gettysburg, Morningside, 1990, .
 Dorsey, Chris "Of Iron and Stone: A Comparison of the Iron and Stonewall Brigades," The Journal of America's Military Past, (Winter, 2001); 48-67.
 Eicher, John H., and Eicher, David J., Civil War High Commands, Stanford University Press, 2001, .
 Fox, William F., Regimental Losses in the American Civil War, reprinted by Morningside Bookshop, Dayton, Ohio, 1993, .
 Herdegen, Lance J., The Men Stood Like Iron: How the Iron Brigade Won Its Name, Indiana University Press, 1997, .
 Nolan, Alan T., The Iron Brigade, A Military History, Indiana University Press, 1961, .

Further reading
 Herdegen, Lance J., Those Damned Black Hats! The Iron Brigade in the Gettysburg Campaign. Savas, 2008. 
Magnusen, Steven R., “To My Best Girl - The Inspiring Life Stories of Rufus Dawes (Iron Brigade) and Mary Gates“, GoToPublish 2020. .
 Madaus, Howard Michael & Richard Zeitlin. "The Flags of the Iron Brigade". Wisconsin Magazine of History, vol. 69, no. 1 (Autumn 1985):3-35.
 Wert, Jeffry D., A Brotherhood of Valor: The Common Soldiers of the Stonewall Brigade, C.S.A., and the Iron Brigade, U.S.A.. Touchstone, 1999. 
 Zeitlin, Richard. "Beyond the Battle: The Flags of the Iron Brigade, 1863-1918". Wisconsin Magazine of History, vol. 69, no. 1 (Autumn 1985):36-66.

External links
Iron Brigade website
Flags of the First Day: An Online Exhibit of Iron Brigade and Confederate battle flags from July 1, 1863 :  (Civil War Trust)

 
Union Army brigades
Indiana in the American Civil War
Michigan in the American Civil War
Military history of Michigan
Wisconsin in the American Civil War
Military units and formations established in 1861
Military units and formations disestablished in 1865